I Can Make a Mess Like Nobody's Business is the solo release from the Early November frontman Ace Enders on Drive-Thru Records, released on October 26, 2004. Spartanburg Herald-Journal include the album on their list of the best albums of the year.

Track listing
 (All songs written by Arthur Enders)
 "Untitled" – 2:07
 "Whispering" – 3:36
 "So I Finally Decided to Give Myself a Reason" – 3:06
 "Timshel" – 3:51
 "The Best Happiness Money Can Buy" – 1:47
 "An Oak Tree Stands Beside a Linden" – 4:14
 "But When the Little Fellow Came Close and Put Both Arms Around His Mother, and Kissed Her in an Appealing Boyish Fashion, She Was Moved to Tenderness" – 3:33
 "Untitled" – 4:25
 "Untitled" – 3:14
 "The Kindler Burns" – 2:56
 "End of the Background Noise" – 4:45
 "Untitled" – 3:54
 "Untitled" – 3:44
 "I Know the Sum and Substance of My Evil" – 4:29
 "Salvy" – 3:00

Personnel
Arthur Enders – vocals, guitar, production
Chris Badami – production, recording, engineering, mixing, drums, additional vocals
Bill Lugg – additional guitar on Untitled 1, slide guitar on The Best Happiness Money Can Buy
Michelle Dispenziere – assistant engineer
Paul Spinella – assistant engineer, additional vocals
David Rimelis – string arrangement, conductor
Evelyn Estava – violin
Elizabeth Schulze – viola
Gerall Hieser – cello
Jeff Kummer – beat box and drums on End of the Background Noise
Joshua M. Ortega – photography, design

Music videos
There are official music videos for "The Best Happiness Money Can Buy" and "So I Finally Decided to Give Myself a Reason"

References
Citations

Sources

 

I Can Make a Mess Like Nobody's Business albums
2004 debut albums
Drive-Thru Records albums
Albums produced by Chris Badami
Ace Enders albums